Dewey surname is of Welsh origin; the surname is an Anglified spelling of "Dewi".

It may refer to:

People
 Alvin Dewey (1912–1987), American special agent
 A. Peter Dewey (1916–1945), American colonel
 Charles Almon Dewey (1877–1958), American judge
 Charles Melville Dewey (1849–1937), American painter
 Charles S. Dewey (1880–1980), American politician
 Chester Dewey (1784–1867), American scientist
 C. Ernest Dewey (1861-1945), American politician
 Davis Dewey (1858–1942), American economist
 Edward H. Dewey (1837–1904), American doctor
 Edward R. Dewey (1895–1978), American economist
 George Dewey (1837–1917), American admiral
 James Dewey, MP for Dorset 1656, and Wareham 1659
 John Dewey (1859–1952), American philosopher, psychologist, and educational reformer
 John Frederick Dewey (born 1937), British geologist
 John J. Dewey (died 1891), American territorial legislator and physician
 Lyster Dewey (1865–1944), American botanist
 Martin Dewey (1881–1933), American orthodontist
 Matthew Dewey (born 1984), Australian composer
 Melvil Dewey (1851–1931), American librarian and creator of the Dewey Decimal System
 Nelson Dewey (1813–1889), American politician
 Orville Dewey (1794–1882), American clergyman
 Rob Dewey (born 1983), Scottish rugby player
 Thomas B. Dewey (1915–1981), American author
 Thomas E. Dewey (1902–1971), American 47th Governor of New York
 Thomas E. Dewey Jr. (b. 1932), American executive
 Tommy Dewey, American actor, producer, and writer

Fictional characters
 Billy Dewey, in the television series Southland
 Ms. Dewey, in a viral marketing campaign for Microsoft Live Search
 Dewey, Cheatem & Howe, a partner in the fictional law firm

See also 
 Justice Dewey (disambiguation)
 Heather Dewey-Hagborg (born 1982), American artist and educator
 Duhé, surname

References